The Wyhra (in its upper course: Wiera) is a river of Saxony and Thuringia, Germany. It is a right tributary of the Pleiße, which it joins near Lobstädt.

See also
List of rivers of Saxony
List of rivers of Thuringia

Rivers of Saxony
Rivers of Thuringia
Rivers of Germany